Dyspessa salicicola is a species of moth of the family Cossidae. It was described by Eduard Friedrich Eversmann in 1848. It is found in Greece, North Macedonia, Bulgaria, Romania, Ukraine, Russia and Turkey.

The length of the forewings is 9–14 mm for males and 9–15 mm for females. The forewings are yellow with a row of four to five dark round spots in the postdiscal area. The hindwings are grey.

Subspecies
Dyspessa salicicola salicicola
Dyspessa salicicola aschabadensis Daniel, 1962 (Central Asia)

References

Moths described in 1848
Dyspessa
Moths of Europe
Moths of Asia